No. 669 Squadron AAC is a squadron of the British Army's Army Air Corps (AAC) which was disbanded on 31 July 2016.

See also

 List of Army Air Corps aircraft units

References

External links
 

Army Air Corps aircraft squadrons
Military units and formations established in 1971